The Uruk Trough is an important Sumerian sculpture found at the site of Uruk, Iraq. It has been part of the British Museum's collection since 1928. Along with the Uruk Vase, the trough is considered to be one of the earliest surviving works of narrative relief sculpture from the Middle East, dating to 3300-3000 BC, during the Uruk period. Simple relief sculpture is known from much earlier periods, from the site of Göbekli Tepe, dating to circa 9000 BC.

It is thought to have served as some sort of cult image in the temple of the goddess Inanna. The carving depicts a procession of sheep, but the meaning of this scene is unclear.

History and discovery
The trough was found at Uruk, an ancient city of Sumer and later Babylonia situated east of the Euphrates in southern Iraq. For a long time power seems to have been concentrated in the temples or religious organisations but eventually King Gilgamesh took over, building new structures and a massive city wall. The Uruk Trough was probably  a venerated object in one of the temples in the city, perhaps devoted to the deity Inanna. The circumstances of its discovery are not known. The trough was purchased by the British Museum with the support of the National Art Collections Fund in 1928, just before the German Oriental Society carried out excavations at the site.

Description
A fragment of one end of the object is now in the Vorderasiatisches Museum in Berlin. Although called a 'trough' it is unlikely that it was used as such, as the decoration would have not been visible to viewers. It is more likely it was used as some sort of cult image, perhaps in the temple of Inanna, the principle goddess in ancient Mesopotamia at this time. The carving shows a procession of rams, ewes and lambs approaching or emerging from a reed building, similar one lived in by the Marsh Arabs in southern Iraq. Experts have so far not been able to explain what the scenes mean, although the reed bundles on the building have been used subsequently as symbols of the goddess Inanna and the carvings may relate to the fecundity of the land under Inanna's protection.

See also
Uruk Vase for a contemporary object decorated in a similar style

References

Further reading
D. Collon, Ancient Near Eastern art (London, The British Museum Press, 1995)
J. Black and A. Green, Gods, demons and symbols of ancient mesopotamia (London, The British Museum Press, 1992)
H.W.F. Saggs, Babylonians (London, The British Museum Press, 1995)
P.P. Delougaz, 'Animals emerging from a hut', Journal of Near Eastern Studies-1, 27 (1968), pp. 186–7

4th-millennium BC works
1928 archaeological discoveries
Middle Eastern sculptures in the British Museum
Sculpture of the Ancient Near East
Uruk
Inanna
Reliefs in the United Kingdom
Sheep in art
Cult images